Pelléas et Mélisande (Pelléas och Mélisande), JS 147 is incidental music by Jean Sibelius for Maurice Maeterlinck's 1892 play Pelléas and Mélisande. Sibelius composed in 1905 ten parts, overtures to the five acts and five other movements. It was first performed at the Swedish Theatre in Helsinki on 17 March 1905 to a translation by Bertel Gripenberg, conducted by the composer.

Sibelius later slightly rearranged the music into a nine movement suite, published as Op. 46, which became one of his most popular concert works.

Movements of the suite 
The movements were derived from the following numbers:

Excluded from the suite is Prelude to Act IV, scene 2, as well as the vocal version of No. 5, Mélisande's Song. Sibelius later made a transcription of the suite for solo piano, excluding the 'At the Seashore' movement.

Orchestration 
The work is scored for flute (with piccolo), oboe (with English horn), two clarinets, two bassoons, two horns, timpani/triangle/bass drum, and strings.

References

External links 
 

Suites by Jean Sibelius
Incidental music by Jean Sibelius
1905 compositions
Adaptations of works by Maurice Maeterlinck